Cyprus competed at the 2022 Winter Olympics in Beijing, China, from 4 to 20 February 2022.

The Cypriot team consisted of one male alpine skier.

Yianno Kouyoumdjian was the country's flagbearer during the opening ceremony. Meanwhile a volunteer was the flagbearer during the closing ceremony.

Competitors
The following is the list of number of competitors participating at the Games per sport/discipline.

Alpine skiing

By meeting the basic qualification standards Cyprus qualified one male alpine skier.

See also
Cyprus at the 2022 Commonwealth Games

References

Nations at the 2022 Winter Olympics
2022
Winter Olympics